Rancho de la Parita is a small unincorporated community in northwestern Jim Wells County, Texas, United States west of Owl Ranch-Amargosa.  It lies at  (28.0194596, -98.2191730), at an elevation of 351 feet (107 m). Rancho de la Parita appears on the Anna Rose U.S. Geological Survey Map.

References

Unincorporated communities in Jim Wells County, Texas
Unincorporated communities in Texas